|}

The Prix Saint-Alary is a Group 1 flat horse race in France open to three-year-old thoroughbred fillies. It is run at Longchamp over a distance of 2,000 metres (about 1 miles), and it is scheduled to take place each year in May.

History
The event is named after Evremond de Saint-Alary (1868–1941), a successful racehorse owner and breeder. It was established in 1960, and was originally contested on Longchamp's middle course (moyenne piste). It was switched to the main course (grande piste) in 1987.

The Prix Saint-Alary serves as a trial for the following month's Prix de Diane. Twelve fillies have won both races. The first was La Sega in 1962, and the most recent was Laurens in 2018.

Records
Leading jockey (9 wins):
 Freddy Head – Tidra (1967), Pistol Packer (1971), Riverqueen (1976), Reine de Saba (1978), Three Troikas (1979), Harbour (1982), Fitnah (1985), Lacovia (1986), Treble (1991)

Leading trainer (8 wins):
 André Fabre – Grise Mine (1984), Rosefinch (1992), Intrepidity (1993), Moonlight Dance (1994), Muncie (1995), Luna Wells (1996), Vadawina (2005), Wavering (2011)

Leading owner (8 wins):
 HH Aga Khan IV – Cervinia (1963), Behera (1989), Zainta (1998), Vadawina (2005), Sarafina (2010), Sagawara (2012), Vazira (2014), Siyarafina (2019)

Winners since 1971

Earlier winners

 1960: La Motte
 1961: Solitude
 1962: La Sega
 1963: Cervinia
 1964: Belle Sicambre
 1965: Scala
 1966: Tonnera
 1967: Tidra
 1968: no race
 1969: Saraca
 1970: Lalika

See also
 List of French flat horse races

References

 France Galop / Racing Post:

 galop.courses-france.com:
 1960–1979, 1980–present

 france-galop.com – A Brief History: Prix Saint-Alary.
 galopp-sieger.de – Prix Saint-Alary.
 ifhaonline.org – International Federation of Horseracing Authorities – Prix Saint-Alary (2019).
 pedigreequery.com – Prix Saint-Alary – Longchamp.

Flat horse races for three-year-old fillies
Longchamp Racecourse
Horse races in France
Recurring sporting events established in 1960
1960 establishments in France